Bobirjon Tagaev (uzb: Bobirjon Tagaev Sobirjon ugli, cyrillic: Тагаев Бобиржон born April 5, 1993, in Samarkand, Uzbekistan) is a professional Uzbek Muay Thai kickboxer. He competed at Asian Beach Games 2014, 2016 and won Gold medal of Games in 63.5 kg weight category in 2014

Muay Thai career 

Amateur

In 2014 and 2016 Tagaev took part at the 2014 Asian Beach Games and won Gold medal of Asian Beach Games 2014 in 63.5kg weight category

Round of 16:: Defeated  Ameer Ibrahim (IRQ) 5-0

Quarter-finals: Defeated Jonathan Polosan (PHI) 5-0

Semi-finals: Defeated Võ Văn Đài (VIE) KOB

Finals: Defeated Yuan Bing (CHN) 5-0

World Muay Thai Championships 2014 Thailand - 3rd

In 2015 at Muaythai University World Cup 
The 63.5kg Tagaev Bobirjon won against Thailand’s Suphamongkol Pongpeera in the final and obtained Gold medal of World Cup

Professional Career

As a professional fighter made total 73 fights and won 65 from them.

Top King World Series 2017 1st

Muay Thai record

|-  style="text-align:center; background:#fbb;"
| 2022-03-26 || Loss||align=left| Jamal Yusupov|| Vendetta 25 || Istanbul,Turkey   || Decision (Unanimous) || 3 || 3:00 

|-  style="background:#fbb;"
| 2022-02-26|| Loss ||align=left| Valentin Thibaut ||  Muaythai Night || Dubai, UAE || Decision || 5 || 3:00  
|-
! style=background:white colspan=9 |

|-  style="background:#cfc;"
| 2020-01-17 || Win ||align=left| Yusuf Memmedov || Pitbull Promotion || Turkey || Decision || 3  || 3:00

|- style="background:#fbb;"
| 2019-11-15 || Loss ||align=left| Sitthichai Sitsongpeenong || Macau Fight 2019 || Macau || Ext.R Decision (Unanimous) || 4 || 3:00

|-  style="background:#fbb;"
| 2018-12-22|| Loss ||align=left| Satanfah Rachanon || THAI FIGHT Nakhon Ratchasima || Nakhon Ratchasima, Thailand || Decision || 3 || 3:00  
|-
! style=background:white colspan=9 |

|-  style="background:#fbb;"
| 2018-04-01 || Loss ||align=left| Samingdej Dejphaeng || Real Hero, Tournament Final || Bangkok, Thailand || Decision || 1 ||5:00
|-
! style=background:white colspan=9 |
|-  style="background:#cfc;"
| 2018-04-01 || Win ||align=left| Buakiew Sitsongpeenong || Real Hero, Tournament Semi Final || Bangkok, Thailand || Decision || 1 ||5:00

|-  style="background:#cfc;"
| 2018-04-01 || Win||align=left| Carlos Bezerra  || Real Hero, Tournament Quarter Final || Bangkok, Thailand || TKO (Punches)|| 1 ||0:41

|-  style="background:#cfc;"
| 2017-08-05|| Win||align=left| Arbi Emiev || Topking World Series || Narathiwat province, Thailand || Decision || 3 || 3:00 

|-  style="background:#fbb;"
| 2016-10-15|| Loss ||align=left| PayakSamui Lukjaoporongtom || THAI FIGHT Chengdu || Chengdu, China || Decision || 5 || 3:00 

|-  bgcolor="#fbb"
| 2016-09-25|| Loss ||align=left| Timur Mamazatikov || MAX Muay Thai || Pattaya, Thailand || Decision || 3 || 3:00 

|-  bgcolor="#fbb"
| 2016-04-02|| Loss ||align=left| Singmanee Kaewsamrit || Emei Legend 7, 65 kg Tournament, Group C final || China || TKO || 2 || 
|-
| colspan=9 | Legend:

External links

References 

 

1993 births
Living people
Uzbekistani male kickboxers
Mixed martial artists utilizing Muay Thai
Uzbekistani Muay Thai practitioners